Aminata Doucouré (born 3 April 1994) is a French-born Malian footballer who plays as a defender for the Mali women's national team.

International career
Doucouré competed for Mali at the 2018 Africa Women Cup of Nations, playing in three matches.

References

1994 births
Living people
Citizens of Mali through descent
Malian women's footballers
Women's association football defenders
Mali women's international footballers
People from Gonesse
Footballers from Val-d'Oise
French women's footballers
Black French sportspeople
French sportspeople of Malian descent